"Bad Choice Road" is the ninth and penultimate episode of the fifth season of the AMC crime drama television series Better Call Saul, a spin-off series of Breaking Bad. The episode aired on April 13, 2020, on AMC in the United States. Outside of the United States, the episode premiered on streaming service Netflix in several countries.

Plot 

Jimmy McGill and Mike Ehrmantraut are still wandering the desert. Jimmy finally gets a signal on his cell phone and calls an anxious Kim Wexler, Jimmy tells Kim he's okay.

Jimmy and Mike arrive at a truck stop where Tyrus Kitt and Victor pick them up. Jimmy posts Lalo Salamanca's bail and Lalo is released. As Mike and Jimmy agreed, Jimmy tells Lalo his car broke down and he walked alone cross-country so he would not risk losing the money. Lalo tells Jimmy he plans to avoid police and prosecutors by returning to Mexico.

Kim tends to Jimmy's sunburn and bruises and he tells her the same story he told Lalo. Kim realizes he is lying when she sees that Jimmy saved his bullet-pierced coffee mug.

Mike reports to Gus Fring, who realizes Juan Bolsa arranged the attack on Jimmy to protect Gus' business. Mike tells Gus that Nacho Varga wants to stop working as Gus' informant, but Gus refuses to release a valuable asset.

Jimmy ends a day of convalescence early to deal with a client. Kim tells him she knows he is lying about his desert trip and will be ready to listen when he decides to tell the truth. Kim quits Schweikart and Cokely, handing over the Mesa Verde account and keeping her pro bono clients. As she departs, she takes the bottle stopper she previously kept as a souvenir.

Jimmy tells Mike he is experiencing post-traumatic stress. Mike tells Jimmy it will pass with time. When Jimmy questions the events that brought them to the desert, Mike says they both made choices, good and bad, so they have to live with the consequences.

Lalo says goodbye to Hector Salamanca and has Nacho bring him to the pickup site where Jimmy received Lalo's bail money. Instead of waiting for the Cousins to arrive, Lalo searches for Jimmy's car. After finding it, he tells Nacho to drive back to Albuquerque.

Jimmy and Kim argue about Kim quitting S&C. Mike calls Jimmy to warn him of Lalo's imminent arrival, and tells him to leave his phone on but hidden so Mike can listen. As Lalo questions Jimmy, Mike keeps a sniper rifle trained on Lalo from a nearby roof. Lalo has Jimmy repeat the story of his desert walk, then reveals he found Jimmy's car, which is riddled with bullets. Kim tells Lalo that passersby probably shot at the car for fun and berates him for not trusting Jimmy. Lalo seems satisfied and departs. He tells Nacho to drive to Mexico, but not the original pickup site.

Production 
Paying homage to the season four episode "Something Stupid", the episode begins with a split screen montage involving Jimmy and Kim, set to an instrumental version of Lola Marsh's "Somethin' Stupid" playing in the background. The final scene, with Lalo arriving at Kim and Jimmy's apartment, ran for sixteen minutes without commercial breaks in the original broadcast in order to keep the dramatic tension. Other scenes in the episode were made shorter to allow for additional ad space, which enabled the ad-free final scene.

Alan Sepinwall of Rolling Stone observed that the film that Kim and Jimmy try to watch before Jimmy is called into court is His Girl Friday, which Sepinwall describes as "about a woman who keeps returning to a relationship she knows is deeply unhealthy for her, with a man whose charm and wild professional lifestyle she ultimately can’t resist."

Reception 

"Bad Choice Road" received universal acclaim from critics, with many calling it one of the best episodes of the series. It has a 100% Certified Fresh rating from Rotten Tomatoes, with an average 9.17 out of 10 rating from 13 reviews.

The final scene, the confrontation between Lalo, Jimmy, and Kim, was highly regarded by critics as one of the best scenes of the series, attributing its framing to the scriptwriter and director Thomas Schnauz, and to performances by the lead actors particularly for Rhea Seehorn as Kim and Tony Dalton as Lalo. Sepinwall of Rolling Stone called the scene a "knockout performance" for Seehorn, and the scene itself critical to the show as "the two halves of Better Call Saul itself, long held separate, finally merge into one thrilling, terrifying story". David Segal of The New York Times called the final scene "a nonviolent, psychologically fraught ending to an episode that is low on action and very interior." Steve Greene of IndieWire described the scene as an "impeccably braided sequence, with three threads woven together at a point when a blade threatens to slice each one of them to bits. For a sequence with so little movement, there's a certain choreography at work here that goes beyond simple blocking. Every inch matters when there's a sniper sight trained on the man with a gun in the living room."

TVLine named Rhea Seehorn a "Performer of the Week" for her performance in this episode.

Ratings 
"Bad Choice Road" was watched by approximately 1.51 million viewers on its first broadcast.

Accolades 
For the 72nd Primetime Emmy Awards, Thomas Schnauz received a nomination for Outstanding Writing for a Drama Series for this episode.

Notes

References

External links 
 "Bad Choice Road" at AMC
 

Better Call Saul (season 5) episodes